The Sauer S 2500 is a family of four stroke aircraft engines certified according to JAR 22-H (CS-22 subpart H)

Design and development
The engine is based on the Wasserboxer, extensively modified for aircraft use and all the parts are custom made. They are certified according to CS-22 subpart H and can therefore be used in motorgliders and light aircraft that are certified as CS-VLA and CS-LSA

Variants
Sauer S 2500-1-DS1
Sauer S 2500-1-TS1
Sauer S 2500-1-HS1
Sauer S 2500-1-FS1
Sauer S 2500 T
 A  turbocharged version no longer available and unknown if it ever was available commercially.

Specifications

See also
Sauer Engines

References

External links
 

S2500